Canaan is a small community in the Canadian province of Nova Scotia. Canaan is situated on the south mountain in the county of Kings. Canaan is known for farming and forestry. It houses the Third Horton (Canaan) Baptist Church, the Canaan community centre and the Annapolis Valley Shooting Sports Club. Canaan is minutes from the shopping hubs of New Minas and Kentville and approximately one hour from the provincial capital city of Halifax. Canaan is known for its exceptional view of the Annapolis Valley.

Businesses in the community include automotive repair, welding services, plant nursery sales and a seasonal campground.

Various forms of wildlife make their homes in Canaan including deer, black bear, racoon, coyote, skunks, porcupines, squirrels, chipmunks, snakes ( garter and grass), mice and several species of birds.

On April 27, 1944 two World War II Hawker Hurricane  aircraft based out of Greenwood, Nova Scotia, collided over Canaan killing both pilots.
On July 2, 2016 Canaan hosted the first Canaan Country Music festival. The concert was headlined by Brett Kissel, George Canyon, Wes Mack, Jason Benoit and Jess Moskaluke.

On August 11, 2018 Canaan hosted a second festival renamed the Canaan Mountain Music Festival held over two days. The headline performers included the Canadian country rock band Blue Rodeo, Tim Hicks, River Town Saints, Jimmy Rankin and Tristan Horncastle.

References
  Canaan on Destination Nova Scotia
http://advocatemediainc.com/lighthouse-now-farmer-bears-witness-to-war-over-canaan/

Communities in Kings County, Nova Scotia
General Service Areas in Nova Scotia